Shuorui Yang (born 8 January 2004) is a Chinese freestyle skier who competed at the 2022 Winter Olympics.
 
She is currently ranked 10th in the world in big air and 13th in slopestyle.

References

External links

2004 births
Living people
Chinese female freestyle skiers
Sportspeople from Heilongjiang
Olympic freestyle skiers of China
Freestyle skiers at the 2022 Winter Olympics
Freestyle skiers at the 2020 Winter Youth Olympics
21st-century Chinese women